The Light Tank, T1 was a United States Army light tank of the late 1920s and early 1930s that was only built in prototype form. The tank was an Army design built by James Cunningham, Son and Company. Introduced in 1927, it was developed up through 1932 as a series of modified versions (T1E1, T1E2, T1E3, T1E4, T1E5, and T1E6). The tank was never mass-produced, nor was it ever used in combat.

Design and variants

Most versions of the T1 series of light tanks shared the same basic layout, with the engine mounted in the front and the turret, transmission and final drive all located in the rear. The exceptions were the T1E4 and T1E6, which moved the turret to the middle, the engine to the rear, and the transmission and final drive to the front, a configuration similar to later tanks. All T1 versions had a manually traversed turret armed with a 37 mm main gun and a coaxially mounted .30 caliber (7.62 mm) M1919 Browning machine gun, and all carried a crew of two: a commander who sat within the turret and worked the guns, and a driver seated just in front of the turret.

The single T1 prototype was built in 1927. The transmission, made by Cotta, was a sliding-gear type with three forward gears and one reverse gear. After the prototype was evaluated, it was stripped down to its chassis, which was reused to test other vehicle types.

The T1 prototype was followed in 1928 by the very similar T1E1. Four of these were built, making the T1E1 the only T1 version which was not built as a single prototype. The T1E1 was briefly standardized for production as the Light Tank, M1, but this was revoked after only a couple of months. The T1E1 had a few minor changes from the T1: the hull no longer projected forward of the tracks, and the fuel tanks were moved above the tracks.

The next version, the T1E2, was built in 1929, again as a single prototype.

In 1930 the Ordnance Department modified one of the T1E1 tanks to create the T1E3. In some ways this was a hybrid of the T1E1 and T1E2; it had the high-velocity long-barreled Browning gun, thickened armor, and more powerful engine of the T1E2, but it retained the hull, turret, dimensions, and transmission gear ratios of the T1E1. The most important feature of this version, however, was its suspension, which was completely redesigned. All previous T1 versions had a totally unsprung suspension which used multiple equalizing links between the bogies to spread out impacts from rough terrain. This still gave a very rough ride. The T1E3's suspension had coil springs and hydraulic shock absorbers, and its ride was much smoother.

The T1E4, introduced in 1932, was another alteration of a T1E1 tank. Its transformation was much more radical, however, because the vehicle's layout was completely changed. The engine was moved to the rear, the transmission and final drive to the front, and the turret to the middle of the body. At  in length, the T1E4 was nearly a quarter longer than preceding T1 versions. The T1E4 also got a new suspension, in this case using semi-elliptic leaf springs and articulated four-wheel bogies. (This suspension was similar to that of the British Vickers 6-Ton light tank, which the Army had recently tested.) The armor thickness was similar to the T1E2 and T1E3.

The T1E5, introduced around the same time as the T1E4, was yet another conversion of a T1E1, in this case with a new steering system. All previous T1 versions used a simple clutch-brake steering system which led to a loss of power while turning. The T1E5 replaced this with a controlled differential steering system from the Cleveland Tractor Company (a so-called "Cletrac" system). The engine was also replaced with the same  version as in the T1E4. Testing showed the controlled differential steering to be clearly superior to the clutch-brake system, and the Ordnance Department recommended its use for all tracked vehicles that could exceed .

The final T1 version produced, the T1E6, was introduced in 1932 as a further alteration of the T1E4. The Cunnigham V8 engine was replaced with a  V12 made by the American-LaFrance and Foamite Corporation. However, the maximum speed was still , and the larger V12 engine severely crowded the engine bay, making maintenance troublesome.

Preservation
The T1E2 has been preserved, though without its guns. Previously it was on outdoor display at the U.S. Army Ordnance Museum at Aberdeen Proving Ground in Aberdeen, Maryland. Due to that museum's closure in 2010, it has been moved to the U.S. Army Ordnance Training and Heritage Center at Fort Lee, Virginia, where it is presently in indoor storage and not publicly accessible.

References

Sources

External links

Light Tank M1 at AFV Database

Interwar tanks of the United States
Light tanks of the United States
Trial and research tanks of the United States
Light tanks of the interwar period